William Mercer Green (July 12, 1876 – November 12, 1942), was the 4th Bishop of Mississippi from 1938 till 1942. He was the grandson of William Mercer Green, the 1st Bishop of Mississippi.

Education
Green attended the public schools of Greenville, Mississippi. Later he studied theology and graduated from Sewanee: The University of the South. He also earned his Doctor of Divinity from the same university.

Priest
In 1899 Green was ordained deacon and priest a year later. Most of his priesthood was spent as rector of parishes around Mississippi. He also served as rector of St John's Church in Knoxville, Tennessee. He was also Dean of All Saints College in Vicksburg, Mississippi. His last post prior to his election was as rector of St Andrew's Church in Jackson, Mississippi.

Bishop
In 1919 Green was elected Coadjutor Bishop of Mississippi. He succeeded Bishop Theodore DuBose Bratton as diocesan bishop upon his retirement in 1938. His episcopacy was mostly focused on rural work in the diocese. Green died in office on November 12, 1942. His funeral was held on November 16 and was presided over by R. Bland Mitchell, Bishop of Arkansas.

References

1876 births
1942 deaths
20th-century Anglican bishops in the United States
Episcopal bishops of Mississippi